You Go Now is the second solo album by keyboardist Kevin Moore, former member of Dream Theater.  Moore recorded and released this album under the name Chroma Key.  A number of initial pre-orders for the album in the Summer of 2000 were signed by Moore.

Track listing

Personnel
Kevin Moore - Producer, vocals, keyboards, bass, drums
Steve Tushar - Producer, co-writer, programming, additional guitars, additional keyboards
David Iscove - guitars

References

External links
 Official site where you can listen to the entire album

2000 albums
Chroma Key albums